Polcast Television is a TV broadcaster of four Polish channels: Tele 5, Polonia 1, Water Planet and Novela TV. It was founded in 2006 when Fincast (earlier broadcaster) was no longer entitled to represent them.

Television channels
 Active channels:
Polonia 1 (1993-present)
Tele 5 (2002-present)
Novela TV (2012-present)
Water Planet (2012-present)

 Defunct channels:
Top Shop (1997-2018)
Super 1 (1998-2002)
CSB TV (2010-2012)

References

External links

Mass media companies of Poland
Television networks in Poland
Mass media companies established in 2006
2006 establishments in Poland
Companies based in Warsaw
Polish Limited Liability Companies